Monastic silence is a spiritual practice recommended in a variety of religious traditions for purposes including facilitation of approaching deity, and achieving elevated states of spiritual purity. It may be in accordance with a monk's formal vow of silence, but can also engage laity who have not taken vows, or novices who are preparing to take vows. Monastic silence is more highly developed in the Roman Catholic faith than in Protestantism, but it is not limited to Catholicism. The practice has a corresponding manifestation in the Orthodox church, which teaches that silence is a means to access God, to develop self-knowledge, or to live more harmoniously.
Theophilus, patriarch of Alexandria, placed the virtue of silence on par with the faith itself in a synodal letter from AD 400. "Monks—if they wish to be what they are called—will love silence and the Catholic faith, for nothing at all is more important than these two things."

Practice of silence by ordained and laity 
The practice of silence is observed during different parts of the day; practitioners talk when they need to but maintain a sense of silence or a sense of prayer when talking. The rules of silence apply to both vowed practitioners and non-vowed guests. Religious recommendations of silence as praxis do not deprecate speech when it is thoughtful and considerate of commonly held values. According to Andrew March of the Benedictine order, we "can listen to substantive speech for hours while five minutes of garrulous speech is too much." It is noteworthy that "silence" can include what is more aptly characterized as "quietness", i.e. speaking in low voice tones. Silence is not an absence of words or thoughts—it is a positive and substantive reality.

Christian contemplative traditions

Old Testament roots
In the book Silence, The Still Small Voice of God, Andrew March establishes the roots of silence doctrine in the Psalms attributed to David. 
"Benedict and his monastics would know from chanting the Psalter every week the verse that follows: “I was silent and still; I held my peace to no avail; my distress grew worse, my heart became hot within me. While I mused, the fire burned; then I spoke with my tongue” (Psalm 39: 3).

St. Norbet's Arts Center also anchors its views on silence in the Old Testament: "For God alone my soul waits in silence; from him comes my salvation." (Psalm 62)

Aids to practice 
The Trappist rubric "Living in silence" illustrates centuries-old hand gestures which were "developed to convey basic communication of work and
spirit".

Eastern Orthodox

In Eastern Orthodox Christianity, the mystical tradition of hesychasm emphasizes the importance of hesychia ('silence' or 'stillness').

Benedictine
Silence plays a salient role in the Benedictine rule. It is thought that by clearing the mind of distraction, one may listen more attentively to the deity.

Christian theology differs from Dharmic religions with regard to the mode in which spiritual ascent transpires within the context of contemplative quiet. Buddhism and Hinduism promote various spiritual practices, as do many Christian denominations. However, Christianity, particularly Protestantism, emphasizes the belief that ultimate spiritual achievement is not within the grasp of mortals, no matter how persistent their practice may be. Rather, the mechanism of spiritual attainment, which they regard as salvation and proximity to the deity, is believed to occur solely through supernatural mechanism. This mechanism is variously described as the action of God, conceived as the Father, or by action of the Holy Spirit. This mechanism of action, whether conceptualized as the Father or the Spirit, is called grace.

In contemplative practice, the role of silence is expressed by the Fr. David Bird, OSB, (Order of St. Benedict): "When both our interior and exterior are quiet, God will do the rest."

Cistercian
Cistercian monastics have remained active in the promotion of contemplative meditation. Part of the emphasis is on achieving spiritual ascent, but monastic silence also functions to avoid sin.

Although speech is morally neutral per se, the Epistle of James (3:1–12) and writers of the monastic tradition see silence as the only effective means of neutralizing a tendency towards sins of the tongue. There is an ongoing dialogue between Benedictine and Cistercian which speaks of a "monastic archetype" characterized by peace and silence.

Trappist
A Trappist’s commitment to silence is a monastic value which assures solitude in community. It fosters mindfulness of God and fraternal communion. It opens the mind to the inspirations of the Holy Spirit and favours attentiveness of the heart and solitary prayer to God. Early monastic communities evolved simple hand signing for essential communications. Spoken conversations between monks are permitted, but limited according to the norms established by the community and approved by the Order.

Protestantism
Baptist pastor and evangelist Frederick Brotherton Meyer (1847–1929), a member of the Higher Life movement, developed a strong commitment to silence, which he saw as one of the ways to gain access to God's guidance on all matters.

FB Meyer exerted a deep influence on Frank Buchman (1878–1961), originally a Protestant evangelist who founded the Oxford Group (known as Moral Re-Armament from 1938 until 2001, and as Initiatives of Change since then). Foundational to Buchman's spirituality was the practice of a daily "quiet time" during which, he claimed, anyone could search for, and receive, divine guidance on every aspect of their life. Dr Karl Wick, editor of the Swiss Catholic daily Vaterland, wrote that Buchman had "brought silence out of the monastery into the home, the marketplace, and the board room." Buchman, in turn, taught thousands to "listen and obey", finding amazing resonance with non-Christian as well as Christian religions.

Silence practice in Judaism
Judaism has a tradition of silence in sacred space and in sacred structures.

Rabbi Shmuel Afek starts minyan with five minutes of silence during which each person can engage in his or her own personal preparation for tefillah. Isadore Twersky states in Introduction to the Code of Maimonides: "One must be attuned to the silences".

Judaism also teaches that the Ten Commandments were given to the Jews in complete silence and that If you want to encounter God, you need to experience silence.

Merton: bridging contemplative traditions

One of the leading exponents of monastic contemplative awareness is Thomas Merton.

From Thoughts in Solitude (1956)
According to Merton, silence represents a form of transcending paradoxes such as he may have encountered in zazen training.

The Asian Journal

Monastic life

Contemplative silence as protest 
In addition to being a major figure in the field of contemplative studies, Merton expressed awareness of social issues conscience.

East-West concurrence on role of silent practice
Monastic silence is a category of practice which unites faiths and contributes a perennial topic of convergence between eastern and western traditions. Father Thomas Keating is the founder of Contemplative Outreach and former abbot of St. Benedict's Monastery in Snowmass, Colorado. He states that "as in Buddhism, Christianity has several contemplative methods. The methods of contemplative prayer are expressed in two traditions: centering prayer, which we represent, and Christian Meditation, designed by John Main, which is now spreading rapidly throughout the world under the charismatic leadership of Father Lawrence Freeman."

Keating's approach is more directly influenced by his collaboration with Buddhists from various traditions, whereas Main is influenced by his travels among Indian Hindus. Keating states that one "progresses eventually to Christ nature or Buddha nature" Keating distinguishes his contemplative method from that of John Main, another teacher of Christian mindfulness, but states an affinity for "interior silence". "The John Main approach is a little different than ours, but both go in the same direction: moving beyond dependence on concepts and words to a direct encounter with God on the level of faith and interior silence."

Fr. James Conner, OCSO wrote about the Fifth Christian–Buddhist Contemplative Conference held at the Naropa Institute in which ordained practitioners from Zen, Vajrayana, and Catholic monastic lineages conducted meditation and discussion. According to Conner, wordless prayer is designed to transcend rational processes to allow perception of an exalted state. "Zen says that Buddha-nature begins where the rational level ends. The same is taught in Christianity. One is to practice thoughtless, wordless prayer and thus perceive the divine presence."

Silence motif injected into cross-cultural adaptation
Silence is interjected into this Christian parable in some circles.

One of master Gasan's monks visited the university in Tokyo. When he returned, he asked the master if he had ever read the Christian Bible. "No," Gasan replied, "Please read some of it to me." The monk opened the Bible to the Sermon on the Mount in St. Matthew, and began reading. After reading Christ's words about the lilies in the field, he paused. Master Gasan was silent for a long time. "Yes," he finally said, "Whoever uttered these words is an enlightened being. What you have read to me is the essence of everything I have been trying to teach you here!"

The original rendering of this syncope or parable from the Gospel of Luke does not incorporate silence. The adaptation into Zen tradition could have omitted the role of silence. This particular use of silence is neither monastic nor vowed, but the dialogue may well have taken place in a monastery rather than a university.

Buddhism and Christianity are not the only traditions enunciating the virtues of quietism. The Tao Te Ching enunciates a view of the supreme value of doing absolutely nothing, in a profound metaphysical sense. This is called wu wei and is consistent with the concept of sunyata more fully elaborated in Buddhism. According to the Tao Te Ching, silence is merely the application of this concept to the tongue in addition to hands and feet.

Application of monastic silence practice outside of religious context

The spiritual practice of silence has been extended into the healthcare setting under the rubric of Mind-Body healing. Dr. Jack Engler of the Theravada tradition of Buddhism is Director of the Schiff Psychiatric Center at Harvard University and participates in Christian–Buddhist dialogue. Dr Engller lived as a novice at the Abbey of Gethsemane, which is affiliated with Merton, and studied Buddhist meditation practices in Burma and India.

See also

 Acedia (accidie), noted as a problem of solitary life
 Bodhi
 Christian contemplation
 Christian meditation
 John Chrysostom
 Church Fathers
 Dark Night of the Soul
 Hesychasm
 Hesychia
 Meditation
 Unprogrammed worship
 Mindfulness (psychology)
 Mysticism
 David Steindl-Rast
 Sunyata
 Vipassanā

References

Silence
Asceticism
Monasticism